The Paleocene–Eocene thermal maximum (PETM), alternatively  (ETM1), and formerly known as the "Initial Eocene" or "", was a time period with a more than 5–8 °C global average temperature rise across the event. This climate event occurred at the time boundary of the Paleocene and Eocene geological epochs. The exact age and duration of the event is uncertain but it is estimated to have occurred around 55.5 million years ago (Ma).

The associated period of massive carbon release into the atmosphere has been estimated to have lasted from 20,000 to 50,000 years. The entire warm period lasted for about 200,000 years. Global temperatures increased by 5–8 °C.

The onset of the Paleocene–Eocene thermal maximum has been linked to volcanism and uplift associated with the North Atlantic Igneous Province, causing extreme changes in Earth's carbon cycle and a significant temperature rise. The period is marked by a prominent negative excursion in carbon stable isotope records from around the globe; more specifically, there was a large decrease in 13C/12C ratio of marine and terrestrial carbonates and organic carbon.

Stratigraphic sections of rock from this period reveal numerous other changes. Fossil records for many organisms show major turnovers. For example, in the marine realm, a mass extinction of benthic foraminifera, a global expansion of subtropical dinoflagellates, and an appearance of excursion, planktic foraminifera and calcareous nanofossils all occurred during the beginning stages of PETM. On land, modern mammal orders (including primates) suddenly appear in Europe and in North America. Sediment deposition changed significantly at many outcrops and in many drill cores spanning this time interval.

Since at least 1997, the Paleocene–Eocene thermal maximum has been investigated in geoscience as an analog to understand the effects of global warming and of massive carbon inputs to the ocean and atmosphere, including ocean acidification. Humans today emit about 10 Gt of carbon (about 37 Gt CO2e) per year, and will have released a comparable amount in about 1,000 years at that rate. A main difference is that during the Paleocene–Eocene thermal maximum, the planet was ice-free, as the Drake Passage had not yet opened and the Central American Seaway had not yet closed. Although the PETM is now commonly held to be a "case study" for global warming and massive carbon emission, the cause, details, and overall significance of the event remain uncertain.

Setting
The configuration of oceans and continents was somewhat different during the early Paleogene relative to the present day. The Panama Isthmus did not yet connect North America and South America, and this allowed direct low-latitude circulation between the Pacific and Atlantic Oceans. The Drake Passage, which now separates South America and Antarctica, was closed, and this perhaps prevented thermal isolation of Antarctica. The Arctic was also more restricted. Although various proxies for past atmospheric  levels in the Eocene do not agree in absolute terms, all suggest that levels then were much higher than at present. In any case, there were no significant ice sheets during this time.

Earth surface temperatures increased by about 6 °C from the late Paleocene through the early Eocene. Superimposed on this long-term, gradual warming were at least two (and probably more) "hyperthermals". These can be defined as geologically brief (<200,000 year) events characterized by rapid global warming, major changes in the environment, and massive carbon addition. Though not the first within the Cenozoic, the PETM was the most extreme of these hyperthermals. Another hyperthermal clearly occurred at approximately 53.7 Ma, and is now called ETM-2 (also referred to as H-1, or the Elmo event). However, additional hyperthermals probably occurred at about 53.6 Ma (H-2), 53.3 (I-1), 53.2 (I-2) and 52.8 Ma (informally called K, X or ETM-3). The number, nomenclature, absolute ages, and relative global impact of the Eocene hyperthermals are the source of considerable current research. Whether they only occurred during the long-term warming, and whether they are causally related to apparently similar events in older intervals of the geological record (e.g. the Toarcian turnover of the Jurassic) are open issues.

Acidification of deep waters, and the later spreading from the North Atlantic can explain spatial variations in carbonate dissolution. Model simulations show acidic water accumulation in the deep North Atlantic at the onset of the event.

Evidence for global warming

At the start of the PETM, average global temperatures increased by approximately 6 °C (11 °F) within about 20,000 years. This warming was superimposed on "long-term" early Paleogene warming, and is based on several lines of evidence. Because there was little or no polar ice in the early Paleogene, the shift in  very probably signifies a rise in ocean temperature.
The temperature rise is also supported by analyses of fossil assemblages, the Mg/Ca ratios of foraminifera, and the ratios of certain organic compounds, such as TEXH86.

Precise limits on the global temperature rise during the PETM and whether this varied significantly with latitude remain open issues. Oxygen isotope and Mg/Ca of carbonate shells precipitated in surface waters of the ocean are commonly used measurements for reconstructing past temperature; however, both paleotemperature proxies can be compromised at low latitude locations, because re-crystallization of carbonate on the seafloor renders lower values than when formed. On the other hand, these and other temperature proxies (e.g., TEX86) are impacted at high latitudes because of seasonality; that is, the "temperature recorder" is biased toward summer, and therefore higher values, when the production of carbonate and organic carbon occurred.

Certainly, the central Arctic Ocean was ice-free before, during, and after the PETM. This can be ascertained from the composition of sediment cores recovered during the Arctic Coring Expedition (ACEX) at 87°N on Lomonosov Ridge. Moreover, temperatures increased during the PETM, as indicated by the brief presence of subtropical dinoflagellates, and a marked increase in TEX86. The latter record is intriguing, though, because it suggests a 6 °C (11 °F) rise from ~ before the PETM to ~ during the PETM. Assuming the TEX86 record reflects summer temperatures, it still implies much warmer temperatures on the North Pole compared to the present day, but no significant latitudinal amplification relative to surrounding time.

The above considerations are important because, in many global warming simulations, high latitude temperatures increase much more at the poles through an ice–albedo feedback. It may be the case, however, that during the PETM, this feedback was largely absent because of limited polar ice, so temperatures on the Equator and at the poles increased similarly.

Evidence for carbon addition
Clear evidence for massive addition of 13C-depleted carbon at the onset of the PETM comes from two observations. First, a prominent negative excursion in the carbon isotope composition of carbon-bearing phases characterizes the PETM in numerous (>130) widespread locations from a range of environments. Second, carbonate dissolution marks the PETM in sections from the deep sea.

The total mass of carbon injected to the ocean and atmosphere during the PETM remains the source of debate. In theory, it can be estimated from the magnitude of the negative carbon isotope excursion (CIE), the amount of carbonate dissolution on the seafloor, or ideally both. In some records of bulk carbonate, it is about 2‰ (per mil); in some records of terrestrial carbonate or organic matter it exceeds 6‰. 
Carbonate dissolution also varies throughout different ocean basins. It was extreme in parts of the north and central Atlantic Ocean, but far less pronounced in the Pacific Ocean.
With available information, estimates of the carbon addition range from about 2,000 to 7,000 gigatons.

Comparison with today's climate change
Model simulations of peak carbon addition to the ocean–atmosphere system during the PETM give a probable range of 0.3–1.7 petagrams of carbon per year (Pg C/yr), which is much slower than the currently observed rate of carbon emissions. It has been suggested that today's methane emission regime from the ocean floor is potentially similar to that during the PETM.  (One petagram of carbon = 1 gigaton of carbon, GtC; the current rate of carbon injection into the atmosphere is over 10 GtC/yr, much larger than the carbon injection rate that occurred during the PETM.)

Professor of Earth and planetary sciences James Zachos notes that IPCC projections for 2300 in the 'business-as-usual' scenario could "potentially bring global temperature to a level the planet has not seen in 50 million years" – during the early Eocene. Some have described the PETM as arguably the best ancient analog of modern climate change. Scientists have investigated effects of climate change on chemistry of the oceans by exploring oceanic changes during the PETM.

A study found that the PETM shows that substantial climate-shifting tipping points in the Earth system exist, which "can trigger release of additional carbon reservoirs and drive Earth's climate into a hotter state".

A 2022 study found that the Eurasian Epicontinental Sea acted as a major carbon sink during the PETM due to its high biological productivity and helped to slow and mitigate the warming, and that the existence of many large epicontinental seas at that time made the Earth's climate less sensitive to forcing by greenhouse gases relative to today, when much fewer epicontinental seas exist.

Timing of carbon addition and warming
The timing of the PETM  excursion is of considerable interest. This is because the total duration of the CIE, from the rapid drop in  through the near recovery to initial conditions, relates to key parameters of our global carbon cycle, and because the onset provides insight to the source of 13C-depleted .

The total duration of the CIE can be estimated in several ways. The iconic sediment interval for examining and dating the PETM is a core recovered in 1987 by the Ocean Drilling Program at Hole 690B at Maud Rise in the South Atlantic Ocean. At this location, the PETM CIE, from start to end, spans about 2 m. Long-term age constraints, through biostratigraphy and magnetostratigraphy, suggest an average Paleogene sedimentation rate of about 1.23 cm/1,000yrs. Assuming a constant sedimentation rate, the entire event, from onset though termination, was therefore estimated at 200,000 years. Subsequently, it was noted that the CIE spanned 10 or 11 subtle cycles in various sediment properties, such as Fe content. Assuming these cycles represent precession, a similar but slightly longer age was calculated by Rohl et al. 2000. A ~200,000 year duration for the CIE is estimated from models of global carbon cycling. If a massive amount of 13C-depleted  is rapidly injected into the modern ocean or atmosphere and projected into the future, a ~200,000 year CIE results because of slow flushing through quasi steady-state inputs (weathering and volcanism) and outputs (carbonate and organic) of carbon.

The above approach can be performed at many sections containing the PETM. This has led to an intriguing result. At some locations (mostly deep-marine), sedimentation rates must have decreased across the PETM, presumably because of carbonate dissolution on the seafloor; at other locations (mostly shallow-marine), sedimentation rates must have increased across the PETM, presumably because of enhanced delivery of riverine material during the event.

Age constraints at several deep-sea sites have been independently examined using 3He contents, assuming the flux of this cosmogenic nuclide is roughly constant over short time periods. This approach also suggests a rapid onset for the PETM CIE (<20,000 years). However, the 3He records support a faster recovery to near initial conditions (<100,000 years) than predicted by flushing via weathering inputs and carbonate and organic outputs.

There is other evidence to suggest that warming predated the  excursion by some 3,000 years.

A study in 2020 estimated the Global mean surface temperature (GMST) with 66% confidence during the latest Paleocene (c. 57 Ma) as 22.3 to 28.3 ∘C, PETM (56 Ma) as 27.2 to 34.5 ∘C, and Early Eocene Climatic Optimum (EECO) (53.3 to 49.1 Ma) as 23.2 to 29.7 ∘C.

Effects

Weather

The climate would also have become much wetter, with the increase in evaporation rates peaking in the tropics. Deuterium isotopes reveal that much more of this moisture was transported polewards than normal. Warm weather would have predominated as far north as the Polar basin. Finds of fossils of Azolla floating ferns in polar regions indicate subtropic temperatures at the poles. Central China during the PETM hosted dense subtropical forests as a result of the significant increase in rates of precipitation in the region, with average temperatures between 21°C and 24°C and mean annual precipitation ranging from 1,396 to 1,997 mm. Very high precipitation is also evidenced in the Cambay Shale Formation of India by the deposition of thick lignitic seams as a consequence of increased soil erosion and organic matter burial.

Ocean
The amount of freshwater in the Arctic Ocean increased, in part due to northern hemisphere rainfall patterns, fueled by poleward storm track migrations under global warming conditions.

Anoxia

In parts of the oceans, especially the north Atlantic Ocean, bioturbation was absent. This may be due to bottom-water anoxia, or by changing ocean circulation patterns changing the temperatures of the bottom water. However, many ocean basins remained bioturbated through the PETM.

Sea level

Along with the global lack of ice, the sea level would have risen due to thermal expansion. Evidence for this can be found in the shifting palynomorph assemblages of the Arctic Ocean, which reflect a relative decrease in terrestrial organic material compared to marine organic matter.

Currents
At the start of the PETM, the ocean circulation patterns changed radically in the course of under 5,000 years. Global-scale current directions reversed due to a shift in overturning from the southern hemisphere to northern hemisphere overturning.  This "backwards" flow persisted for 40,000 years. Such a change would transport warm water to the deep oceans, enhancing further warming.

Lysocline
The lysocline marks the depth at which carbonate starts to dissolve (above the lysocline, carbonate is oversaturated): today, this is at about 4 km, comparable to the median depth of the oceans. This depth depends on (among other things) temperature and the amount of  dissolved in the ocean. Adding  initially raises the lysocline, resulting in the dissolution of deep water carbonates. This deep-water acidification can be observed in ocean cores, which show (where bioturbation has not destroyed the signal) an abrupt change from grey carbonate ooze to red clays (followed by a gradual grading back to grey). It is far more pronounced in north Atlantic cores than elsewhere, suggesting that acidification was more concentrated here, related to a greater rise in the level of the lysocline. In parts of the southeast Atlantic, the lysocline rose by 2 km in just a few thousand years. Evidence from the tropical Pacific Ocean suggests a minimum lysocline shoaling of around 500 m at the time of this hyperthermal.

Life
Stoichiometric magnetite particles were obtained from PETM-age marine sediments. The study from 2008 found elongate prism and spearhead crystal morphologies, considered unlike any magnetite crystals previously reported, and are potentially of biogenic origin. These biogenic magnetite crystals show unique gigantism, and probably are of aquatic origin. The study suggests that development of thick suboxic zones with high iron bioavailability, the result of dramatic changes in weathering and sedimentation rates, drove diversification of magnetite-forming organisms, likely including eukaryotes. Biogenic magnetites in animals have a crucial role in geomagnetic field navigation.

Ocean
The PETM is accompanied by a mass extinction of 35–50% of benthic foraminifera (especially in deeper waters) over the course of ~1,000 years – the group suffering more than during the dinosaur-slaying K-T extinction (e.g.,). Contrarily, planktonic foraminifera diversified, and dinoflagellates bloomed. Success was also enjoyed by the mammals, who radiated extensively around this time.

The deep-sea extinctions are difficult to explain, because many species of benthic foraminifera in the deep-sea are cosmopolitan, and can find refugia against local extinction. General hypotheses such as a temperature-related reduction in oxygen availability, or increased corrosion due to carbonate undersaturated deep waters, are insufficient as explanations. Acidification may also have played a role in the extinction of the calcifying foraminifera, and the higher temperatures would have increased metabolic rates, thus demanding a higher food supply. Such a higher food supply might not have materialized because warming and increased ocean stratification might have led to declining productivity  and/or increased remineralization of organic matter in the water column, before it reached the benthic foraminifera on the sea floor. The only factor global in extent was an increase in temperature. Regional extinctions in the North Atlantic can be attributed to increased deep-sea anoxia, which could be due to the slowdown of overturning ocean currents, or the release and rapid oxidation of large amounts of methane. Oxygen minimum zones in the oceans may have expanded.

In shallower waters, it's undeniable that increased  levels result in a decreased oceanic pH, which has a profound negative effect on corals. Experiments suggest it is also very harmful to calcifying plankton. However, the strong acids used to simulate the natural increase in acidity which would result from elevated  concentrations may have given misleading results, and the most recent evidence is that coccolithophores (E. huxleyi at least) become more, not less, calcified and abundant in acidic waters. No change in the distribution of calcareous nanoplankton such as the coccolithophores can be attributed to acidification during the PETM. Acidification did lead to an abundance of heavily calcified algae and weakly calcified forams.

A study published in May 2021 concluded that fish thrived in at least some tropical areas during the PETM, based on discovered fish fossils including Mene maculata at Ras Gharib, Egypt.

Land
Humid conditions caused migration of modern Asian mammals northward, dependent on the climatic belts. Uncertainty remains for the timing and tempo of migration.

The increase in mammalian abundance is intriguing. Increased  levels may have promoted dwarfing – which may have encouraged speciation. Major dwarfing occurred early in the PETM, with further dwarfing taking place during the middle of the hyperthermal. The dwarfing of various mammal lineages led to further dwarfing in other mammals whose reduction in body size was not directly induced by the PETM. Many major mammalian orders – including the Artiodactyla, horses, and primates – appeared and spread around the globe 13,000 to 22,000 years after the initiation of the PETM.

Temperature
Proxy data from one of the studied sites show rapid +8 °C temperature rise, in accordance with existing regional records of marine and terrestrial environments. Notable is the absence of documented greater warming in polar regions compared to other regions. This implies a non-existing ice-albedo feedback, suggesting no sea or land ice was present in the late Paleocene.

Terrestrial
During the PETM, sediments are enriched with kaolinite from a detrital source due to  denudation (initial processes such as volcanoes, earthquakes, and plate tectonics). This suggests increased precipitation, and enhanced erosion of older kaolinite-rich soils and sediments. Increased weathering from the enhanced runoff formed thick paleosoil enriched with carbonate nodules (Microcodium like), and this suggests a semi-arid climate.

In the Tremp-Graus Basin of northern Spain, fluvial systems grew and rates of deposition of alluvial sediments increased with a lag time of around 3,800 years after the PETM.

Possible causes
Discriminating between different possible causes of the PETM is difficult. Temperatures were rising globally at a steady pace, and a mechanism must be invoked to produce an instantaneous spike which may have been accentuated or catalyzed by positive feedback (or activation of "tipping or points"). The biggest aid in disentangling these factors comes from a consideration of the carbon isotope mass balance. The assumption underpinning this approach is that the mass of exogenic carbon was the same in the Paleogene as it is today – something which is very difficult to confirm.

Eruption of large kimberlite field
Although the cause of the initial warming has been attributed to a massive injection of carbon ( and/or CH4) into the atmosphere, the source of the carbon has yet to be found. The emplacement of a large cluster of kimberlite pipes at ~56 Ma in the Lac de Gras region of northern Canada may have provided the carbon that triggered early warming in the form of exsolved magmatic . Calculations indicate that the estimated 900–1,100 Pg of carbon required for the initial approximately 3 °C of ocean water warming associated with the Paleocene-Eocene thermal maximum could have been released during the emplacement of a large kimberlite cluster. The transfer of warm surface ocean water to intermediate depths led to thermal dissociation of seafloor methane hydrates, providing the isotopically depleted carbon that produced the carbon isotopic excursion. The coeval ages of two other kimberlite clusters in the Lac de Gras field and two other early Cenozoic hyperthermals indicate that  degassing during kimberlite emplacement is a plausible source of the  responsible for these sudden global warming events.

Volcanic activity

To balance the mass of carbon and produce the observed  value, at least 1,500 gigatons of carbon would have to degas from the mantle via volcanoes over the course of the two, 1,000 year, steps. To put this in perspective, this is about 200 times the background rate of degassing for the rest of the Paleocene. There is no indication that such a burst of volcanic activity has occurred at any point in Earth's history. However, substantial volcanism had been active in East Greenland for around the preceding million years or so, but this struggles to explain the rapidity of the PETM. Even if the bulk of the 1,500 gigatons of carbon was released in a single pulse, further feedbacks would be necessary to produce the observed isotopic excursion.

On the other hand, there are suggestions that surges of activity occurred in the later stages of the volcanism and associated continental rifting. Intrusions of hot magma into carbon-rich sediments may have triggered the degassing of isotopically light methane in sufficient volumes to cause global warming and the observed isotope anomaly. This hypothesis is documented by the presence of extensive intrusive sill complexes and thousands of kilometer-sized hydrothermal vent complexes in sedimentary basins on the mid-Norwegian margin and west of Shetland.  Volcanic eruptions of a large magnitude can impact global climate, reducing the amount of solar radiation reaching the Earth's surface, lowering temperatures in the troposphere, and changing atmospheric circulation patterns.  Large-scale volcanic activity may last only a few days, but the massive outpouring of gases and ash can influence climate patterns for years.  Sulfuric gases convert to sulfate aerosols, sub-micron droplets containing about 75 percent sulfuric acid. Following eruptions, these aerosol particles can linger as long as three to four years in the stratosphere. Further phases of volcanic activity could have triggered the release of more methane, and caused other early Eocene warm events such as the ETM2. It has also been suggested that volcanic activity around the Caribbean may have disrupted the circulation of oceanic currents, amplifying the magnitude of climate change.

A 2017 study noted strong evidence of a volcanic carbon source (greater than 10,000 petagrams of carbon), associated with the North Atlantic Igneous Province. A 2021 study found the PETM was directly preceded by volcanism.

Comet impact
One theory holds that a 12C-rich comet struck the earth and initiated the warming event. A cometary impact coincident with the P/E boundary can also help explain some enigmatic features associated with this event, such as the iridium anomaly at Zumaia, the abrupt appearance of a localized kaolinitic clay layer with abundant magnetic nanoparticles, and especially the nearly simultaneous onset of the carbon isotope excursion and the thermal maximum.

A key feature and testable prediction of a comet impact is that it should produce virtually instantaneous environmental effects in the atmosphere and surface ocean with later repercussions in the deeper ocean. Even allowing for feedback processes, this would require at least 100 gigatons of extraterrestrial carbon. Such a catastrophic impact should have left its mark on the globe. A clay layer of 5-20m thickness on the coastal shelf of New Jersey contained unusual amounts of magnetite, but it was found to have formed 9-18 kyr too late for these magnetic particles to have been a result of a comet's impact, and the particles had a crystal structure which was a signature of magnetotactic bacteria rather than an extraterrestrial origin. However, recent analyses have shown that isolated particles of non-biogenic origin make up the majority of the magnetic particles in the clay sample.

A 2016 report in Science describes the discovery of impact ejecta from three marine P-E boundary sections from the Atlantic margin of the eastern U.S., indicating that an extraterrestrial impact occurred during the carbon isotope excursion at the P-E boundary. The silicate glass spherules found were identified as microtektites and microkrystites.

Burning of peat
The combustion of prodigious quantities of peat was once postulated, because there was probably a greater mass of carbon stored as living terrestrial biomass during the Paleocene than there is today since plants in fact grew more vigorously during the period of the PETM. This theory was refuted, because in order to produce the  excursion observed, over 90 percent of the Earth's biomass would have to have been combusted.  However, the Paleocene is also recognized as a time of significant peat accumulation worldwide. A comprehensive search failed to find evidence for the combustion of fossil organic matter, in the form of soot or similar particulate carbon.

Orbital forcing
The presence of later (smaller) warming events of a global scale, such as the Elmo horizon (aka ETM2), has led to the hypothesis that the events repeat on a regular basis, driven by maxima in the 400,000 and 100,000 year eccentricity cycles in the Earth's orbit. The current warming period is expected to last another 50,000 years due to a minimum in the eccentricity of the Earth's orbit. Orbital increase in insolation (and thus temperature) would force the system over a threshold and unleash positive feedbacks. The orbital forcing hypothesis has been challenged by a study finding the PETM to have coincided with a minimum in the ∼400 kyr eccentricity cycle, inconsistent with a proposed orbital trigger for the hyperthermal.

Methane release
The other theories are not fully sufficient to cause the carbon isotope excursion or warming observed at the PETM. The most obvious feedback mechanism that could amplify the initial perturbation is that of methane clathrates. Under certain temperature and pressure conditions, methane – which is being produced continually by decomposing microbes in sea bottom sediments – is stable in a complex with water, which forms ice-like cages trapping the methane in solid form. As temperature rises, the pressure required to keep this clathrate configuration stable increases, so shallow clathrates dissociate, releasing methane gas to make its way into the atmosphere. Since biogenic clathrates have a  signature of −60 ‰ (inorganic clathrates are the still rather large −40 ‰), relatively small masses can produce large  excursions. Further, methane is a potent greenhouse gas as it is released into the atmosphere, so it causes warming, and as the ocean transports this warmth to the bottom sediments, it destabilizes more clathrates. 

In order for the clathrate hypothesis to be applicable to PETM, the oceans must show signs of having been warmer slightly before the carbon isotope excursion, because it would take some time for the methane to become mixed into the system and -reduced carbon to be returned to the deep ocean sedimentary record. Up until the 2000s, the evidence suggested that the two peaks were in fact simultaneous, weakening the support for the methane theory. In 2002, a short gap between the initial warming and the  excursion was detected.  In 2007, chemical markers of surface temperature (TEX86) had also indicated that warming occurred around 3,000 years before the carbon isotope excursion, although this did not seem to hold true for all cores.  However, research in 2005 found no evidence of this time gap in the deeper (non-surface) waters.  Moreover, the small apparent change in TEX86 that precede the  anomaly can easily (and more plausibly) be ascribed to local variability (especially on the Atlantic coastal plain, e.g. Sluijs, et al., 2007) as the TEX86 paleo-thermometer is prone to significant biological effects.  The  of benthic or planktonic forams does not show any pre-warming in any of these localities, and in an ice-free world, it is generally a much more reliable indicator of past ocean temperatures. 

Analysis of these records reveals another interesting fact: planktonic (floating) forams record the shift to lighter isotope values earlier than benthic (bottom dwelling) forams. The lighter (lower ) methanogenic carbon can only be incorporated into the forams' shells after it has been oxidised. A gradual release of the gas would allow it to be oxidised in the deep ocean, which would make benthic forams show lighter values earlier. The fact that the planktonic forams are the first to show the signal suggests that the methane was released so rapidly that its oxidation used up all the oxygen at depth in the water column, allowing some methane to reach the atmosphere unoxidised, where atmospheric oxygen would react with it. This observation also allows us to constrain the duration of methane release to under around 10,000 years. 

However, there are several major problems with the methane hydrate dissociation hypothesis. The most parsimonious interpretation for surface-water forams to show the  excursion before their benthic counterparts (as in the Thomas et al. paper) is that the perturbation occurred from the top down, and not the bottom up.  If the anomalous  (in whatever form: CH4 or ) entered the atmospheric carbon reservoir first, and then diffused into the surface ocean waters, which mix with the deeper ocean waters over much longer time-scales, we would expect to observe the planktonics shifting toward lighter values before the benthics.  Moreover, careful examination of the Thomas et al. data set shows that there is not a single intermediate planktonic foram value, implying that the perturbation and attendant  anomaly happened over the lifespan of a single foram – much too fast for the nominal 10,000-year release needed for the methane hypothesis to work.

There has been some debate about whether there was a large enough amount of methane hydrate to be a major carbon source; a 2011 paper proposed that was the case. The present-day global methane hydrate reserve was once considered to be between 2,000 and 10,000 Gt C (billions of tons of carbon), but is now estimated between 1500–2000 Gt C. However, because the global ocean bottom temperatures were ~6 °C higher than today, which implies a much smaller volume of sediment hosting gas hydrate than today, the global amount of hydrate before the PETM has been thought to be much less than present-day estimates. In a 2006 study, scientists regarded the source of carbon for the PETM to be a mystery.  A 2011 study, using numerical simulations suggests that enhanced organic carbon sedimentation and methanogenesis could have compensated for the smaller volume of hydrate stability.

A 2016 study based on reconstructions of atmospheric  content during the PETM's carbon isotope excursions (CIE), using triple oxygen isotope analysis, suggests a massive release of seabed methane into the atmosphere as the driver of climatic changes. The authors also note:

It was estimated in 2001 that it would take around 2,300 years for an increased temperature to diffuse warmth into the sea bed to a depth sufficient to cause a release of clathrates, although the exact time-frame is highly dependent on a number of poorly constrained assumptions. Ocean warming due to flooding and pressure changes due to a sea-level drop may have caused clathrates to become unstable and release methane. This can take place over as short of a period as a few thousand years. The reverse process, that of fixing methane in clathrates, occurs over a larger scale of tens of thousands of years. In 2019, a study suggested that there was a global warming of around 2 degrees several millennia before PETM, and that this warming had eventually destabilized methane hydrates and caused the increased carbon emission during PETM, as evidenced by the large increase in barium ocean concentrations (since PETM-era hydrate deposits would have been also been rich in barium, and would have released it upon their meltdown). In 2022, a  foraminiferal records study had reinforced this conclusion, suggesting that the release of CO2 before PETM was comparable to the current anthropogenic emissions in its rate and scope, to the point that that there was enough time for a recovery to background levels of warming and ocean acidification in the centuries to millennia between the so-called pre-onset excursion (POE) and the main event (carbon isotope excursion, or CIE). A 2021 paper had further indicated that while PETM began with a significant intensification of volcanic activity and that lower-intensity volcanic activity sustained elevated carbon dioxide levels, "at least one other carbon reservoir released significant greenhouse gases in response to initial warming".

Ocean circulation
The large scale patterns of ocean circulation are important when considering how heat was transported through the oceans. Our understanding of these patterns is still in a preliminary stage. Models show that there are possible mechanisms to quickly transport heat to the shallow, clathrate-containing ocean shelves, given the right bathymetric profile, but the models cannot yet match the distribution of data we observe.  "Warming accompanying a south-to-north switch in deepwater formation would produce sufficient warming to destabilize seafloor gas hydrates over most of the world ocean to a water depth of at least 1900 m." This destabilization could have resulted in the release of more than 2000 gigatons of methane gas from the clathrate zone of the ocean floor.

Arctic freshwater input into the North Pacific could serve as a catalyst for methane hydrate destabilization, an event suggested as a precursor to the onset of the PETM.

Recovery
Climate proxies, such as ocean sediments (depositional rates) indicate a duration of ∼83 ka, with ∼33 ka in the early rapid phase and ∼50 ka in a subsequent gradual phase.

The most likely method of recovery involves an increase in biological productivity, transporting carbon to the deep ocean. This would be assisted by higher global temperatures and  levels, as well as an increased nutrient supply (which would result from higher continental weathering due to higher temperatures and rainfall; volcanoes may have provided further nutrients). Evidence for higher biological productivity comes in the form of bio-concentrated barium. However, this proxy may instead reflect the addition of barium dissolved in methane. Diversifications suggest that productivity increased in near-shore environments, which would have been warm and fertilized by run-off, outweighing the reduction in productivity in the deep oceans.

See also

Abrupt climate change
Azolla event
Canfield ocean
Clathrate gun hypothesis
Climate sensitivity
Eocene
Eocene Thermal Maximum 2
Paleocene
Paleogene
Runaway climate change

References

Further reading

External links
BBC Radio 4, In Our Time, The Paleocene–Eocene Thermal Maximum, 16 March 2017
Global Warming 56 Million Years Ago: What it Means for Us (Video)

History of climate variability and change
Paleocene
Eocene
Paleogene events